Maratha, Santalaris and Aloda massacre refers to a massacre of Turkish Cypriots by EOKA B; a Greek Cypriot paramilitary group. On 14 August 1974, during the Turkish invasion of Cyprus in the villages of Maratha, Santalaris and Aloda, 89 (or 84) people from Maratha and Santalaris, and a further 37 people from the village of Aloda were killed. In total, 126 people were killed. The massacre occurred on the same day before the second Turkish invasion, concurring with other massacres.

Background 
According to the 1960 census, the inhabitants of the three villages were entirely Turkish Cypriots. The total population of Maratha and Santalaris was 207. By 1973, the total population of the villages had risen to 270, with 124 in Maratha, 100 in Santalaris and 46 in Aloda. However, in July 1974, following the first Turkish invasion of Cyprus, all men of fighting age were taken away as prisoners of war to internment camps in Famagusta and from there transferred to Limassol.

Massacre 

On 20 July 1974, the men of the villages were arrested by EOKA-B and sent to Limassol. Following this, according to testimonials cited by Sevgül Uludağ, EOKA-B men from the neighboring village of Peristeronopigi came, got drunk in the camp they established in the village coffeehouse, fired shots in the air, and subsequently raped many women and young girls. The rape later included the boys and this continued till 14 August 1974. Upon the launch of the second invasion of the Turkish Army, they decided not to leave behind any witnesses and killed the entire population of the villages present at the time.

In Maratha and Santalaris, 84-89 were killed. The imam of Maratha stated that there were 90 people in the village prior to the massacre, and only six people were left. Elderly people and children were also killed during the massacre. Only three people were able to escape from the massacre in Aloda. The inhabitants of the three villages were buried in mass graves with a bulldozer. The villagers of Maratha and Santalaris were buried in the same grave.

Associated Press described the corpses as "so battered and decomposed that they crumbled to pieces when soldiers lifted them from the garbage with shovels". Milliyet reported that parts of the bodies had been chopped off and sharp tools, as well as machine guns had been used in the massacre.

According to Greek Cypriot writer and researcher Tony Angastiniotis, at least one of the attackers used a mainland Greek accent, which suggested that he was a Greek officer.

Reactions 
The United Nations described the massacre as a crime against humanity, by saying "constituting a further crime against humanity committed by the Greek and Greek Cypriot gunmen." The massacre was reported by international media, including The Guardian and The Times.

Rauf Denktaş put off a meeting with Greek Cypriots after the mass grave was uncovered.

See also
List of massacres in Cyprus

References

External links
Mass grave is found in Aloa, Cyprus Footage of Associated Press from the discovery of a mass grave in Aloa

Massacres of ethnic groups
Greek war crimes
Mass graves
Massacres in Cyprus
1974 in Cyprus 
Cyprus dispute
EOKA B
Mass murder in 1974
Massacres in 1974
August 1974 events in Europe
Crimes against humanity
Persecution of Turkish Cypriots
Deaths by firearm in Cyprus
1970s murders in Cyprus